Coldstream is a burgh in the Scottish Borders on the northern shore of River Tweed.

Coldstream may also refer to:

, one of several ships
Coldstream, Victoria, near Melbourne, Australia
Coldstream, New South Wales, in the Northern Rivers District, Australia
Coldstream River, a watercourse of the Clarence River catchment in the Northern Rivers district
Coldstream, Kentucky, USA
Coldstream, Ohio, USA
Coldstream, British Columbia, Canada
Coldstream, Ontario, Canada
Coldstream, New Brunswick, Canada
Cold Stream, a tributary of Becaguimec Stream in New Brunswick, Canada
Coldstream, Nova Scotia, Canada
 Coldstream, Eastern Cape, South Africa

See also
Coldstream Guards, the oldest regular regiment in continuous service in the British Army